Newton University was a university in Baltimore, Maryland that was given a charter by the state of Maryland in 1845.  It had a 77-member self-perpetuating board of regents.  The first chancellor was Joseph Barlett Burleigh.  After his death in 1849 he was succeeded by J. N. McJilton (1805-1875), an Episcopal clergyman who was active in Baltimore City Public Schools on the Board of School Commissioners.  By 1852 the institution had seven professors.  The university, located on East Lexington Street between North Calvert and North (later Guilford Avenue) Streets, ran into legal troubles beginning in 1856 and closed in 1859. There is an engraving/sketch of the block showing the buildings in the collections of the former Peale Museum, later the Baltimore City Life Museums which merged into the collections of the Maryland Historical Society in 1997.

https://msa.maryland.gov/msa/stagser/s1259/121/6050/images/i000815.pdf

Footnotes 

Educational institutions established in 1845
Defunct private universities and colleges in Maryland
1845 establishments in Maryland
1859 disestablishments in Maryland
Educational institutions disestablished in 1859
Universities and colleges in Baltimore